Luis Rodríguez (born 19 August 1966) is a Spanish former sprinter and coach.

Career
Rodriguez competed for Spain at the 1991 IAAF World Indoor Championships in Seville, finishing fifth in his heat and qualifying for the semi finals in the 200 metres. He also competed in the 4 × 100 metres relay at the 1991 World Championships in Athletics. He ran a personal best of 10.27 seconds for the 100 metres in May 1990 in Seville.

His personal best 200 metres time was 20.91 recorded in Salamanca in July 1992.

Coaching career
He coaches his niece María Isabel Pérez who competed for Spain the 2018 European Athletics Championships in Berlin and the 2020 Olympic Games in Tokyo.

References

1966 births
Living people
Spanish male sprinters
Spanish Olympic coaches
Spanish sports coaches